Koshtova is a village in Kosovo.

Demography 
In 2011 census, the village had in total 1,702 inhabitants, from whom 1,697 ( 99,71 %) were Albanians, three Bosniaks and one other. One was not available.

Notes

References 

Villages in Mitrovica, Kosovo